Virtual Seduction is a 1995 American made-for-television thriller film directed by Paul Ziller and starring Jeff Fahey and Ami Dolenz. It was part of the Roger Corman Presents series and originally aired on Showtime on August 1, 1995.

The film was shot in Vancouver.

Cast 
 Jeff Fahey as Liam Bass
 Ami Dolenz as Laura
 Carrie Genzel as Paris
 Meshach Taylor as Anderson
 Frank Novak as Dr. Grant
 Kevin Alber as Reynolds

References

External links

Virtual Seduction at Letterbox DVD

1995 television films
1995 films
1990s thriller films
1990s English-language films
Films produced by Roger Corman
Showtime (TV network) films
American thriller television films
Saban Entertainment films
Films directed by Paul Ziller
1990s American films